In Senekal v Meyer, an important case in South African succession law, the testator had a valid will. On it he had written the word “gekanselleer” (cancelled) on both of the pages of the copy in his possession. The Master, however, accepted the testator's attorney’s copy as the deceased's valid will and testament.

The deceased's current wife sought an order from the court declaring that the deceased had died intestate, as he had intended to revoke this earlier will. This was opposed by the deceased's first wife, who was the sole heir in terms of the will. The court held that the deceased had expressed a clear intention to revoke his will, and so the deceased was found to have died intestate.

See also 
 South African succession law

References 
 Senekal v Meyer 1975 (3) SA 372 (T).

Notes 

Law of succession in South Africa
South African case law
1975 in case law
1975 in South African law